The Colombian longtail snake (Enuliophis sclateri), also known commonly as the sock-headed snake and the white-headed snake, is a species of snake in the family Colubridae. The species, which is monotypic in the genus Enuliophis, is native to Central America and northern South America.

Etymology
The specific name, sclateri, is in honor of British zoologist Philip Lutley Sclater.

Geographic range
E. sclateri is found in Honduras, Nicaragua, Costa Rica, Panama, and Colombia.

Habitat

Reproduction
E. sclateri is oviparous.

References

Further reading
Boulenger GA (1894). Catalogue of the Snakes in the British Museum (Natural History). Volume II., Containing the Conclusion of the Colubridæ Aglyphæ. London: Trustees of the British Museum (Natural History). (Taylor and Francis, printers). xi + 382 pp. + Plates I–XX. (Leptocalamus sclateri, new species, p. 251 + Plate XII, figure 1).
McCranie JR, Villa J (1993). "A new genus for the snake Enulius sclateri (Colubridae: Xenodontinae)". Amphibia-Reptilia 14 (3): 261–267. (Enuliophis, new genus; Enuliophis sclateri, new combination).
Savage JM (2002). The Amphibians and Reptiles of Costa Rica: A Herpetofauna between Two Continents, between Two Seas. Chicago and London: University of Chicago Press. xx + 945 pp. . (Enulius sclateri, pp. 589–590).
Taylor EH (1954). "Further Studies on the Serpents of Costa Rica". University of Kansas Science Bulletin 36 (2): 673–800. (Enulius sclateri, pp. 707–708).

Dipsadinae
Monotypic snake genera
Reptiles of Colombia
Reptiles described in 1894
Reptiles of Nicaragua
Taxa named by George Albert Boulenger